Abd al-Shakur ibn Yusuf was Emir of Harar (1783–1794). He was the first Emir of Harar to give the neighboring Oromo gifts. He went to them in the first years of his reign, and brought with him bales of sheetings which he gave to the Jarso and Nole Oromo. He may have done this to free the way for salt and other goods which had to be brought through their territories.

Another example of his efforts to "civilize" the Oromo was his construction of a shrine to the Baghdadi saint `Abd al-Qadir al-Jilani near the tomb of Sheikh Hussein, which lies to the south deep in the territory of the Oromo people.

Emir al-Shakur's attempts to reform the administrative system of Harar, by reintroducing the institutions of sijill and diwan, is attested in a document dated to AD 1785/6.

See also
List of emirs of Harar
Harar
Abd al-Qadir al-Jilani
Sheikh Hussein

Notes 

Emirs of Harar
18th-century monarchs in Africa
Year of death uncertain
Year of birth uncertain